The Texas Longhorns baseball team represents The University of Texas at Austin in NCAA Division I intercollegiate men's baseball competition. The Longhorns currently compete in the Big 12 Conference.

The University of Texas began varsity intercollegiate competition in baseball in 1894. Texas is the winningest NCAA Division I college baseball program of all time in terms of win percentage, with an all-time win–loss record of 3696–1396–32 as of the end of the 2022 season, including a 3526–1248–28 versus collegiate opponents. The Longhorns rank second in all-time wins, behind the Fordham Rams. Texas has won 79 regular-season conference championships and 16 conference tournament championships in baseball.

The Longhorns have won six NCAA baseball national championships (1949, 1950, 1975, 1983, 2002, 2005)—tied with LSU and second to Southern California's total of 12—and have been the runner-up in the College World Series (CWS) Championship Game or Championship Series on six other occasions (1953, 1984, 1985, 1989, 2004, 2009). Texas holds the records for most appearances in the College World Series (38), most individual CWS games won (88), most overall NCAA Tournament games won (253), and most NCAA Tournament appearances (61); the second-place programs in these categories have 26 CWS appearances (Miami), 74 CWS game wins (Southern California), 199 overall NCAA Tournament wins (Florida State), and 58 NCAA Tournament appearances (Florida State), as of the end of the 2021 season.

Former Longhorns who have gone on to success in Major League Baseball include Roger Clemens, Calvin Schiraldi, Burt Hooton, Keith Moreland, Spike Owen, Mark Petkovsek, Greg Swindell, Brandon Belt, and Huston Street.

From 1997 to 2016, the Longhorns were led by head coach Augie Garrido, who holds the record for most wins in NCAA baseball history. The team is currently led by fifth-year head coach David Pierce. Texas plays its home games at UFCU-Disch-Falk Field.

History

The Longhorn baseball program has been remarkably stable over the last century.  Over a 105-year period (1911–2016), it had only four full-time coaches—Billy Disch (1911–1939), Bibb Falk (1940–1967), Cliff Gustafson (1968–1996), and Augie Garrido (1997–2016).  David Pierce, previously head coach at Tulane University, was hired as Texas' fifth head coach on June 29, 2016.

The Longhorns have won national titles in 1949, 1950, 1975, 1983, 2002, and 2005.

The early years (1894–1910)
The Texas Longhorns baseball team started in 1894, with the first game in 1895.  Records from the first two years are incomplete.  The first collegiate victory was over Add-Ran College, what is today Texas Christian University, on April 21, 1897.  Seven different managers, including some that were also the school's football coach, led the team.  Four times, the team won a conference title, including one in the Southern Intercollegiate Athletic Association and three in the Southwestern Intercollegiate Athletic Association.  The team played its home games in the first Clark Field during this time.

William J. "Billy" Disch era (1911–1939)
In 1911, Billy Disch took over the reins of the program. Disch retired following the 1939 season. During this time, he led the Longhorns to 22 conference titles, with two in the Texas Intercollegiate Athletic Association and 20 in the Southwest Conference. This included a run of 10 consecutive conference titles from 1913 to 1922. Disch won 465 collegiate games during his tenure with the Longhorns. In 1928, the team moved to the second Clark Field, which was famous for its limestone cliff and goat path in left-center field.

Bibb Falk era (1940–1967)
In 1940, former Longhorn baseball and major league outfielder Bibb Falk became the head coach. Except for a three-year period from 1943 to 1945, during which the team was led by assistant football coach Blair Cherry, Falk coached the team until 1967. Under Falk's guidance, the Longhorns won 20 Southwest Conference titles; the Longhorns won two conference titles under Cherry. Under Falk, Texas won its first two College World Series championships (in 1949 and 1950). The Longhorns won 434 collegiate games during his tenure.

Cliff Gustafson era (1968–1996)
Falk retired after the 1967 season and was succeeded by one of his former players, Cliff Gustafson. During his time in Austin, Gustafson led the Longhorns to 22 conference titles, 11 conference tournament championships, and College World Series championships in 1975 and 1983. Texas won 1,427 collegiate games during his tenure. In 1975, the school moved from the second Clark Field into the new Disch-Falk Field, which was named for Billy Disch and Bibb Falk.

Augie Garrido era (1997–2016)

After Cliff Gustafson retired in 1996, Augie Garrido took over the helm at Texas.  During his tenure, the school won seven Big 12 Conference titles, four conference tournament championships, and two national championships, in 2002 and 2005. Augie died March 15, 2018.

David Pierce era (2016–present)
On June 29, 2016, it was announced that David Pierce (previously head coach at Tulane and Sam Houston State) would take over being head coach at the Longhorns after the announcement of Augie Garrido's resignation.

Through 2018 Coach Pierce's teams have appeared in the NCAA baseball tournament in all seven years he has been a head coach (2012–2018), including 2017–2018 with the Longhorns.

In 2018, the Texas Longhorns won the Big 12 Championship for the first time since 2011. In the 2018 NCAA tournament they advanced to and hosted an NCAA Super Regional for the first time since 2008 by defeating Texas Southern, Texas A&M and Indiana University in the NCAA Austin regional. They defeated Tennessee Tech in three games to advance to the 2018 College World Series.

National championship teams

1949

The Longhorns defeated Wake Forest 10–3 in the championship game to claim their first National Championship.  Notable players on the team include Charlie Gorin, Tom Hamilton, and Murray Wall.

1950

Texas defeated Washington State 3–0 to become the first school to repeat as champions of the College World Series.  Notable players on the team include: Charlie Gorin, Kal Segrist, and Murray Wall.

1975

Texas won their third National Championship in school history by defeating South Carolina 5–1 in the championship game.  Notable players on the team include Jim Gideon, Don Kainer, Keith Moreland, Mickey Reichenbach, and Richard Wortham.

1983

Texas won their fourth National Championship in school history by defeating Alabama 3–2 in the championship game.  Notable players on the team include Billy Bates, Mike Brumley, Mike Capel, Roger Clemens, Jeff Hearron, Bruce Ruffin, Calvin Schiraldi, Kirk Killingsworth and Jose Tolentino.

2002

Texas won their fifth National Championship in school history by defeating South Carolina 12–6 in the championship game.  Notable players on the team include Brad Halsey, Omar Quintanilla, and Huston Street.

2005

Texas won their sixth National Championship in school history by defeating Florida 4–2 and 6–2 in the championship round.  Notable players on the team include Taylor Teagarden, Drew Stubbs, and David Maroul.

Longest game in college-baseball history

On May 30, 2009, the Longhorns and Boston College played in the longest game in college-baseball history—a 25-inning game, during the NCAA Division I Baseball Championship regional tournament at Austin, Texas. The Longhorns—who were designated the visiting team despite playing on their home field—won, 3–2. The game lasted seven hours and three minutes.

All-time season results

When the Overall and Collegiate Records are different, the Collegiate Record is listed in parentheses.

All-time series records

Big 12 members
*Through March 28, 2022.
Information Source: 2018 Texas Longhorns Baseball Media Guide – All-Time Series Records section
2018 Season Results
2019 Season Results

Former Big 12 and SWC members

Colorado and Nebraska both competed in the Big 12 from 1997 to 2011.  Arkansas (1915–1991), Rice (1915–1996), SMU (1918–1996), and Houston (1971–1996) all competed in the Southwest Conference.  Missouri and Texas A&M both left for the SEC in 2012.
*Through March 1, 2022.
Information Source: 2018 Texas Longhorns Baseball Media Guide – All-Time Series Records section
2018 Season Results
2019 Season Results

Head coaches

There have been 14 head coaches since the inaugural team in 1895. Since 1911 there have been only 6. The current heach coach is David Pierce.

Records through March 19, 2023

Rivalries
The Longhorns enjoy spirited rivalries with Arkansas Razorbacks, Texas A&M, Oklahoma State, Oklahoma, Texas Tech, and Baylor among others.

Arkansas

Baylor
Texas's rivalry with Baylor dates back April 4, 1903, when the Longhorns beat the Bears 13–1 in Austin.  Since then, the schools have competed in an annual series, alternating between campuses as host.

Oklahoma
Texas's rivalry with Oklahoma dates back May 9, 1910, when the Longhorns beat the Sooners 3–2 in Austin.  Oklahoma was part of the Texas Intercollegiate Athletic Association and later the Southwest Conference until 1997, when both schools joined the Big 12, playing each other for one series every year from 1940 to 1972. often in the NCAA Division I Baseball Tournament.

Oklahoma State
Texas's rivalry with Oklahoma State dates back May 1, 1913, when the Longhorns beat the Cowboys 4–1 in Austin.  Oklahoma State, then known as Oklahoma A&M, was part of the Texas Intercollegiate Athletic Association and later the Southwest Conference until 1925.  Between 1919 and 1997, when both joined the Big 12, the schools played each other sporadically.  When they did compete, it was often in NCAA Division I Baseball Tournament.

Texas A&M

The Longhorns rivalry with Texas A&M is part of the Lone Star Showdown.  The baseball rivalry dates back to April 24, 1903, when the Longhorns defeated the Aggies 6–2 in College Station.  The Longhorns and Aggies combined to win or share 75 of 81 Southwest Conference regular season championships and 13 of 19 conference tournaments.  In Big 12 play, the two schools have shared 10 of 15 regular season titles and 7 of 15 conference tournaments.  After the 2012 season, Texas A&M left for the SEC.

Texas Tech
Texas's rivalry with Texas Tech dates back March 22, 1968, when the Longhorns beat the Red Raiders 7–5 in Lubbock.  That was the year Texas Tech joined the Southwest Conference.  Since then, the schools have competed each year in a three-game series.

Individual awards

National College Baseball Hall of Fame 
The Longhorns have had eight players, three coaches, and one veteran inducted into the National College Baseball Hall of Fame, more than any other school.

Source:

National awards 

Golden Spikes Award
Ivan Melendez – 2022

Dick Howser Trophy
Scott Bryant – 1989
Brooks Kieschnick – 1992, 1993
Taylor Jungmann – 2011
Ivan Melendez – 2022

Collegiate Baseball Newspaper Player of the Year
Greg Swindell — 1986
Scott Bryant – 1989
Brooks Kieschnick – 1993
Ivan Melendez – 2022 

Baseball America Player of the Year
Brooks Kieschnick – 1993
Ivan Melendez – 2022

ABCA Player of the Year
Scott Bryant – 1989
Brooks Kieschnick – 1992, 1993
Kody Clemens – 2018
Ivan Melendez – 2022

D1Baseball Player of the Year
Ivan Melendez – 2022

NCBWA Stopper of the Year
J. B. Cox – 2005
Chance Ruffin – 2010
Corey Knebel – 2011

College World Series Most Outstanding Player
Tom Hamilton – 1949
J. L. Smith – 1953
Mickey Reichenbach – 1975
Calvin Schiraldi – 1983
Huston Street – 2002
David Maroul – 2005

Baseball America Freshman of the Year
Greg Swindell – 1984
Kirk Dressendorfer – 1988
Brooks Kieschnick – 1991

NCBWA Freshman Pitcher of the Year
Corey Knebel – 2011

Collegiate Baseball Newspaper Freshman Pitcher of the Year
Corey Knebel – 2011

ABCA/Rawlings Gold Glove
Brooks Marlow – 2014

Bobby Bragan Collegiate Slugger Award
Ivan Melendez – 2022

Baseball America Coach of the Year
Augie Garrido – 2002
David Pierce – 2018

Collegiate Baseball Newspaper Coach of the Year
Cliff Gustafson – 1983
Augie Garrido – 2002, 2005

First Team All-Americans 
The University of Texas has had 57 players named to first team All-American and more than 20 players to the first team Freshman All-American team.

All College World Series 
Over 45 players have been named to the All College World Series team.

Conference awards

Southwest Conference 

Southwest Conference Player of the Year
Greg Swindell – 1986
Brian Cisarik – 1987
Kirk Dressendorfer – 1988, 1989, 1990
Brooks Kieschnick – 1991, 1992, 1993
Danny Peoples – 1996

Southwest Conference Tournament Most Outstanding Player
Keith Creel – 1979
Burk Goldthorn – 1981
José Tolentino – 1983
Brian Cisarik – 1988
Charles Abernathy – 1991
Calvin Murray – 1992
Brooks Kieschnick – 1993
Ryan Kjos – 1994

First Team All Southwest Conference 
From 1922 until the conference dissolved in 1996, 352 Longhorns were named first team all Southwest Conference.

Southwest Conference All Tournament Team 
From 1981 to 1996, 66 to the first team all Southwest Conference Tournament team.

Big 12 Conference 

Big 12 Conference Player of the Year
Drew Stubbs – 2006
Kyle Russell – 2007
Kody Clemens - 2018
Ivan Melendez - 2022

Big 12 Conference Pitcher of the Year
Justin Simmons – 2002
J.P. Howell – 2004
Kyle McCulloch – 2006
Adrian Alaniz – 2007
Cole Green – 2010
Taylor Jungmann – 2011
Ty Madden – 2021

Big 12 Conference Tournament Most Outstanding Player
Dustin Majewski – 2002, 2003
Brandon Belt – 2008
Brandon Loy – 2009
Zane Gurwitz - 2015

Big 12 Conference Newcomer/Freshman Pitcher of the Year
Charlie Thames – 2000
Gerrit Simpson & Justin Simmons – 2001
Huston Street – 2002
Chance Ruffin – 2008
Parker French – 2012

Big 12 Conference Newcomer/Freshman Player of the Year
Omar Quintanilla – 2001
J. D. Reininger – 2002
Taylor Teagarden – 2003
Drew Stubbs – 2004
Erich Weiss – 2011

Big 12 Conference Manager of the Year
Augie Garrido – 2002, 2006, 2007, 2010, 2011
David Pierce - 2018, 2021

First Team All Big 12 Conference 
Since joining the Big 12 for the 1997 season, 58 Longhorns have been named a first team all-conference selection.

Big 12 Conference All Tournament Team 
Since 1997, over 30 players have been named to the all tournament team.

No-hitters
Throughout the history of the program, Texas pitchers have combined to throw 21 no-hitters, including one perfect game.

On April 3, 1970 James Street shutout Texas Tech 4–0 over seven innings in Lubbock, TX to secure the first and only perfect game in Longhorn's history. This was also the only perfect game in the history of the Southwest Conference.

Retired numbers
Texas has seven retired numbers from nine different players.

Records

Single-season team records 

Games
 Most Games Played: 80 (1983 team)
 Most Victories: 66 (1983 team)
 Most Losses: 32 (1998 team)
 Best Winning Percentage: .908 (1982 team)
 Longest Winning Streak: 34 (1977 team)

Offense
 Most At-Bats: 2,512 (1985 team)
 Most Runs Scored: 663 (1985 team)
 Most Hits: 785  (1985 team)
 Most Doubles: 177 (1989 team)
 Most Triples: 51 (1975 team)
 Most Home Runs: 81 (2010 team)
 Most Total Bases: 1,186 (2002 team)
 Most Runs Batted In: 597 (1985 team)
 Most Sacrifice Hits: 126 (2000 team)
 Most Walks: 548 (1985 team)
 Most Strikeouts: 578 (2021 team)
 Most Stolen Bases: 173 (1982 team)
 Most Double Plays: 80 (2005 team)
 Highest Batting Average: .325 (1975 team)
 Highest Slugging Percentage: .508 (1974 team)

Pitching
 Most Innings Pitched: 669 (1983 team)
 Most Saves: 23 (2002 and 2011 team)
 Lowest Earned Run Average: 1.88 (1970 team)
 Most Complete Games: 40 (1983 team)
 Most Shutouts: 16 (1975 team)
 Most Strikeouts: 618 (1985 team)

Fielding
 Highest Fielding Percentage: .982 (2011 and 2017 team)
 Fewest Errors: 43 (2017 team)

Source:

Notable players

Over 100 former Longhorns have gone on to play Major League Baseball.

 Jim Acker
 Max Alvis
 Tony Arnold
 Brandon Belt
 Bill Bethea
 Scott Bryant
 Dave Chalk
 Roger Clemens
 Dennis Cook
 Jordan Danks
 Kirk Dressendorfer
 Scott Dunn
 Brandon Fahey
 Bibb Falk
 Ron Gardenhire
 Jerry Don Gleaton
 Wayne Graham
 Cliff Gustafson
 Joe Hague
 Brad Halsey
 Shane Halter
 Tom Hamilton
 Kip Harkrider
 Tommy Harmon
 Grady Hatton
 Pinky Higgins
 Michael Hollimon
 Burt Hooton
 J.P. Howell
 Tex Hughson
 Randy Jackson
 Rudy Jaramillo
 Taylor Jungmann
 Brooks Kieschnick
 Corey Knebel
 Ernie Koy
 Bobby Layne
 Sam LeCure
 David Maroul
 Keith Moreland
 Calvin Murray
 Spike Owen
 Mark Petkovsek
 Omar Quintanilla
 Mickey Reichenbach
 Shane Reynolds
 Bruce Ruffin
 Chance Ruffin
 James Russell
 Calvin Schiraldi
 Phil Seibel
 J. L. Smith
 Huston Street
 Drew Stubbs
 Greg Swindell
 Taylor Teagarden
 Curtis Thigpen
 Brandon Workman

See also

Clark Field II
List of Big 12 Conference champions in baseball
List of NCAA Division I baseball programs
List of Texas Longhorns in the MLB Draft
List of Southwest Conference champions in baseball

References

External links